Badass or bad ass may refer to:

A quality of personality or behavior inspiring fear, awe and respect; see masculinity, toughness and macho.

Entertainment
 Badass (book), a 2009 book by Ben Thompson
 Badass (guitar bridges), a manufacturer of bridges for guitars and basses
 Bad Ass (film), a 2012 film
Bad Asses, its 2014 sequel
 Baadasssss!, a 2003 American film by Mario Van Peebles
 B4.Da.$$, an album by American rapper Joey Badass

Songs

 "Bad Ass" (song), by American rapper Kid Ink
 "Badass" (Saliva song)
 "Badass", song by Terry Anderson (musician)
 "Badass", by The Bouncing Souls
 "Badass", song by The Crystal Method from CSII Exclusives EP
 "Badass", song by Kacy Crowley
 "Badass" (October 2003 Ruff Demo), song by Garbage from the Run Baby Run single
 "Badass", by Los Enanitos Verdes
 "Badass", song by Reckless Love  
 "Badass", by Matthew Sweet
 Bad Ass, album by Stonewall Jackson

See also 

 Badas (disambiguation)